The House at 5 Lincoln Road in Brookline, Massachusetts, is a well-preserved local example of Italianate architecture.  This -story wood-frame house was probably built in 1852 by Samuel Crafts, around the same time he built the nearby House at 25 Stanton Road.  The two houses were essentially identical in their original construction; 25 Stanton underwent some modification in the 1870s.  This house exhibits classical Italianiate styling, including deep bracketed eaves, and round-arch windows in the gables, as well as heavy cornices over the windows.

The house was listed on the National Register of Historic Places in 1985.

See also
National Register of Historic Places listings in Brookline, Massachusetts

References

Houses in Brookline, Massachusetts
Italianate architecture in Massachusetts
Houses completed in 1852
National Register of Historic Places in Brookline, Massachusetts
Houses on the National Register of Historic Places in Norfolk County, Massachusetts
1852 establishments in Massachusetts